Ibtisam is an Arabic given name. Among Arabic speakers it is considered a feminine name, but among south Asian Muslims it is also used to name males.

 Ibtisam Barakat, Palestinian-American  writer, poet, and educator
 Ibtisam Lutfi, Saudi Arabian female singer
 Ibtisam Youssef Khalil Al-Nawafleh, Jordanian legislator
Ibtisam Sheikh, Pakistani cricketer
Ibtisam al-Samadi, Syrian poet and academic.

See also
Ibtissam

Arabic feminine given names